Ion Rațiu (6 June 1917 – 17 January 2000) was a Romanian lawyer, diplomat, journalist, businessman, writer, and politician. He was also the official presidential candidate of the Christian Democratic National Peasants' Party (PNȚ-CD) in the 1990 presidential election in which he subsequently ranked third, behind the neo-Communist Ion Iliescu of the National Salvation Front (FSN) and Radu Câmpeanu of the National Liberal Party (PNL), with only 4.29% of the vote.

Subsequently, on more than one occasion, he was named by major newspapers and online publications in Romania as "the best president Romania never had". During his years spent in exile, Rațiu met and discussed with important political figures of the Western world such as former British Prime Minister Margaret Thatcher, former American President Jimmy Carter as well as Republican Senate Majority Leader Bob Dole.

Although he wasn't the winner of the 1990 Romanian presidential election, Ion Rațiu successfully managed to remain in a significant part of the Romanian collective mindset as one of the most influential politicians of the 1990s, being admired and publicly revered by generations of subsequent Romanian politicians, some of whom had previously claimed to have even voted for him back in 1990, most notably, at least reportedly according to one of his books, the 5th and current President of Romania, Klaus Werner Iohannis.

Biography

Early life and academic studies
His grandmother. Eugenia Turcu, was the daughter of Romanian activist and journalist Ion Codru-Drăgușanu. He attended school in Turda and from 1928 to 1933 the George Barițiu High School in Cluj, and in 1938 he earned a law degree from King Ferdinand I University in Cluj.

In 1940, Rațiu was named Counsellor at the Romanian Legation in London, under Minister Viorel V. Tilea. In September 1940, King Carol II fled Romania and this led to the formation of the National Legionary State. As a result, Rațiu resigned from the Foreign Service, and requested political asylum in the United Kingdom. In 1943, Rațiu earned an economics degree from the University of Cambridge. In 1945, Rațiu married Elisabeth Pilkington, the daughter of colonel Guy Pilkington; the couple had two children, Indrei and Nicolae.

Life in exile in the United Kingdom after World War II
Rațiu remained in exile in London after the Communist Party (PCR) came to power in Romania in 1947. From the start of World War II, he joined the fight against totalitarianism of any political colour, helping to organize the Central European Student and Youth Society.

In 1961, he started publishing the Free Romanian Press, a weekly news bulletin, in association with FCI, Holland Road, London, directed by another prominent exile, Josef Josten. He also contributed regularly to the BBC Romanian service, Radio Free Europe, and Voice of America. In 1957, Rațiu published his critique of Western attitudes towards the Soviet Union and communism, ‘Policy for the West’.

In 1975, the year he published Contemporary Romania, he decided to devote all his energy to the pursuit of a free Romania. He played a key role in the setting up of the World Union of Free Romanians, of which he was elected president at its first congress in Geneva (1984). Shortly after this, he started publishing The Free Romanian/Românul liber, a monthly newspaper in English and Romanian.

Political activity in post-1989 Romania
After he returned to Romania in January 1990, he helped to re-create the National Peasants' Party (PNȚ), serving as its vice-president. Shortly thereafter, he unsuccessfully ran for president in the 1990 election on behalf of the PNȚCD while also being endorsed by the PSDR; subsequently, he was elected as deputy of the Romanian Chamber of Deputies for Cluj County in both 1990 and 1992, and then Arad, in 1996. He also served as vice-president of the Chamber of Deputies, and ambassador and negotiator for Romania's integration in NATO's structures. In 1991, he re-founded the newspaper Cotidianul.

Paraphrasing Evelyn Beatrice Hall, Rațiu offered in a televised debate in 1990 the most elegant definition of democracy: "I will fight until my last drop of blood so you have the right not to agree with me!"

After a short illness, Rațiu died in London on 17 January 2000, surrounded by his family. In accordance with his wishes, he was buried in his Transylvanian hometown, Turda.

Electoral history

Presidential elections

References

External links
  Short biography, on the "Rațiu Center for Democracy" website
  Rațiu Family Foundation Website
 

1917 births
2000 deaths
People from Turda
Romanian Greek-Catholics
Romanian newspaper editors
Romanian newspaper founders
English people of Romanian descent
Christian Democratic National Peasants' Party politicians
Members of the Chamber of Deputies (Romania)
Candidates for President of Romania
Babeș-Bolyai University alumni
Romanian expatriates in England
Romanian democracy activists
Romanian defectors
Romanian dissidents
Alumni of St John's College, Cambridge
20th-century Romanian politicians